Billy Dickson is an American cinematographer and television director.

As a cinematographer he is best known for his work on the television series Ally McBeal, for which he was nominated for two Primetime Emmy Awards for Outstanding Cinematography for a Single-Camera Series in 2001 and 2002. He was also a cinematographer for numerous television films and photographed the television series The Big Easy, Hidden Hills and 12 Miles of Bad Road.

As a television director, he directed episodes of Ally McBeal, One Tree Hill and the reality series Majors & Minors. In 2008, Dickson created the internet television series IQ-145, starring Thomas Dekker and Lindsey McKeon. Dickson also directed, edited, photographed and wrote all the episodes for the series. Billy was Writer/Director/DP/Executive Producer on the 2016 Christian Film of the Year Believe, distributed by Smith Global Media and Sony Home Entertainment.

References

External links

American cinematographers
American television directors
Living people
Place of birth missing (living people)
Year of birth missing (living people)